Tavita G. Sio,  also known by his anglicised name David Sio (born Apia, 21 June 1962) is a former Samoan rugby union player. He played as a prop.

Career
He made his debut for Samoa in a test match against Tonga, at Tokyo on April 11, 1990. He was part of the 1991 Rugby World Cup roster. His last international match was in a test match against Fiji, at Suva, on June 20, 1992.

Personal life
He is the father of Scott Sio, who currently plays for Australia.

References

External links
 David Sio International Statistics
 Tavita G. Sio International Statistics

1962 births
Living people
Samoan rugby union players
Rugby union props
Samoa international rugby union players
Samoan expatriate rugby union players
Sportspeople from Apia
Expatriate rugby union players in Australia
Samoan expatriate sportspeople in Australia
Samoan emigrants to Australia
Canterbury rugby union players
Samoan expatriate sportspeople in New Zealand
Expatriate rugby union players in New Zealand